Verkhnyaya Barabanovka is a rural locality in Maximovsky Selsoviet, Yanaulsky District, Bashkortostan, Russia. The population was 202 as of 2014. It has 6 streets.

Geography 
Verkhnyaya Barabanovka is located 33 km east of Yanaul (the district's administrative centre) by road. Maximovo is the nearest rural locality.

References 

Rural localities in Yanaulsky District